The Curtiss F7C Seahawk was a carrier-capable biplane fighter aircraft of the United States Navy Marine Corps in the late 1920s and early 1930s.

Design and development
Curtiss' Model 43 was their first aircraft designed expressly for the Navy, rather than a modified Army type. While clearly a descendant of the P-1 Hawk, its wings were constant-chord rather than tapered, and the upper wing had a slight sweepback. The engine was a  Pratt & Whitney R-1340-B Wasp radial. Entirely fabric-covered, the top wing was framed with spruce, while the fuselage was built from a combination of aluminum and steel tubing, sufficiently strong to serve as a dive bomber as well as a fighter.

Operational history
The prototype XF7C-1 first flew on 28 February 1927. After some modification demanded by the Navy (such as the wing sweepback), 17 production aircraft F7C-1 Seahawks were built, and entered service in the USMC's VF-5M at Quantico. In 1930 VF-9M organized the Marines' first aerobatic stunt team, "The Red Devils", with F7Cs featuring red painted noses. They continued in service until 1933.

Variants

XF7C-1: Prototype aircraft; one built.
F7C-1 Seahawk: Single-seat fighter aircraft, main production version; 17 built.
XF7C-2: Single F7C-1 conversion for evaluation with the  Wright R-1820-1 radial engine and large-span full-span flaps.
XF7C-3: A demonstration prototype for China with an armament of four  M1919 Browning machine guns, I-type interplane struts, and ailerons on both the upper and lower wings rather than on just the upper wing. The type was superseded by the Model 64, F11C Goshawk.

Operators

United States Marine Corps

Specifications (F7C-1)

See also

References

Notes

Bibliography

 Barrow, Jess C. WWII Marine Fighting Squadron Nine (VF-9M) (Modern Aviation Series). Blue Ridge Summit, Pennsylvania: Tab Books Inc., 1981. . 
 Eden, Paul and Soph Moeng, eds. cover The Complete Encyclopedia of World Aircraft. London: Amber Books Ltd., 2002. .
 Jones, Lloyd S. U.S. Naval Fighters. Fallbrook, California: Aero Publishers, 1977, pp. 50–52. .

1920s United States fighter aircraft
F07C Seahawk
Carrier-based aircraft
Single-engined tractor aircraft
Biplanes
Aircraft first flown in 1927